Mathieu Assou-Ekotto (born 8 April 1978) is a French retired footballer who played mainly as a midfielder.

Over the course of nine seasons, he amassed Belgian Pro League totals of 132 games and two goals, mainly in representation of Mouscron.

Football career
Born in Sainte-Catherine, Pas-de-Calais, Assou-Ekotto spent nine years with local RC Lens all levels comprised but played mainly for the reserves during his spell, only appearing in three Ligue 1 games with the club. Released in the 1998 summer, he moved to Belgium and joined R.E. Mouscron.

In the 2000 off-season, Assou-Ekotto returned to France and played for three teams in three-and-a-half seasons, competing in the second, third and fourth divisions (in the latter two levels with Valenciennes FC). On 19 January 2004 he moved back to Belgium and its Pro League, signing with R.A.A. Louviéroise.

Assou-Ekotto contributed with 11 matches in the first half of the 2005–06 campaign to Standard Liège's runner-up position, before joining Willem II from the Netherlands in the following winter transfer window. In yet another January move, he signed for former club Mouscron – first joining on loan – going on to play with the Hainaut side until they folded in December 2009.

The following February, Assou-Ekotto resumed his career at Boussu Dour Borinage in the Belgian Second Division. He left by mutual consent in January 2012, returning days later.

Personal life
Assou-Ekotto's younger brother, Benoît, was also a footballer. A defender, he too started his career at Lens, going on to spend several years in the Premier League with Tottenham Hotspur, and represented their ancestral Cameroon at international level.

References

External links

1978 births
Living people
Sportspeople from Arras
French sportspeople of Cameroonian descent
French footballers
Association football midfielders
Ligue 1 players
Ligue 2 players
Championnat National players
RC Lens players
US Créteil-Lusitanos players
Valenciennes FC players
Grenoble Foot 38 players
Belgian Pro League players
Challenger Pro League players
R.E. Mouscron players
R.A.A. Louviéroise players
Standard Liège players
Eredivisie players
Willem II (football club) players
French expatriate footballers
Expatriate footballers in Belgium
Expatriate footballers in the Netherlands
Footballers from Hauts-de-France
R.F.C. Seraing (1922) players
French expatriate sportspeople in the Netherlands
French expatriate sportspeople in Belgium